Party Down is an American sitcom created and primarily written by John Enbom, Rob Thomas, Dan Etheridge, and Paul Rudd that premiered on the Starz network in the United States on March 20, 2009. The series follows a group of caterers in Los Angeles as they hope to make it in Hollywood.

Starz canceled Party Down on June 30, 2010. While the show was warmly received by critics, its Nielsen ratings were very low. Losing Jane Lynch to Glee as well as Adam Scott to Parks and Recreation were believed to be additional factors in the decision to end the series. In November 2021, a six-episode revival of the series was ordered by the network. The third season premiered on February 24, 2023.

Premise
This half-hour comedy follows a Los Angeles catering team for the titular company. The sextet of aspiring Hollywood actors and writers, as well as drifting lost souls, work small-time catering gigs while hoping for their break or some positive change in their lives. Each episode finds the team working a new event, and inevitably getting tangled up with the colorful, affluent guests and their absurd lives.

Cast

Main cast
 Adam Scott as Henry Pollard, a failed actor who returns to Party Down catering after he quit acting. He is most well known for a beer ad where his line "Are we having fun yet?" earned him fame but killed his career. Apathetic and a perpetual underachiever, he often plays straight man to the rest of his coworkers and is most often the most level-headed of the group. His romantic relationship with Casey is a recurring plot element in the show.
 Ken Marino as Ronald Wayne "Ron" Donald, the prideful team leader of Party Down catering who is very uptight when it comes to work and strives for customer satisfaction. He is a recovering alcoholic and drug addict, although he relapses when under pressure from work as he suffers from low self-esteem. His dream is to own a Soup R' Crackers, a franchise that offers all-you-can-eat soup. After getting the money, the business shuts down after five months, forcing Ron to return to Party Down but not as team leader.
 Lizzy Caplan as Casey Klein (seasons 1–2), a struggling comedian and actress who often disregards authority, especially Ron's. She was married at the start of the series but got divorced and started a relationship with Henry to make a "clean break" from her marriage.
 Ryan Hansen as Kyle Bradway, an actor, model, and front man for the band Karma Rocket. He believes he is the "total package" and is just waiting for his big break.
 Martin Starr as Roman DeBeers, a screenwriter who is a fan of hard science fiction. Often frustrated by his lack of success, he harshly judges his colleagues and party guests.
 Jane Lynch as Constance Carmell (seasons 1 and 3; guest star season 2), a former actress who befriends and mentors aspiring actor Kyle.  Lynch did not appear in the last two episodes of the first season due to her commitment to Glee.  Lynch guest starred in the final episode of the second season.
 Jennifer Coolidge as Bobbie St. Brown (season 1, episodes 9 and 10), Constance's roommate who replaces her on the Party Down team after her absence.
 Megan Mullally as Lydia Dunfree (seasons 2–3), a recent divorcee who has moved to Hollywood hoping to achieve stardom for her 13-year-old daughter Escapade. She is very optimistic and naive, constantly seeking advice from people in the entertainment business.
 Jennifer Garner as Evie (season 3), a film producer who is reevaluating her life and career.
 Tyrel Jackson Williams as Sackson (season 3), a Party Down employee and content creator.
 Zoë Chao as Lucy (season 3), a Party Down employee and aspiring food artist and celebrity chef.

Recurring cast
 J. K. Simmons as Leonard Stiltskin, disgruntled, foul-mouthed film producer who appears in season 1's "Taylor Stiltskin Sweet Sixteen" and season 2's "Precious Lights Pre-School Auction".
 Joey Lauren Adams as Diandra Stiltskin, Leonard's unhappy and unfaithful wife who tries to seduce Kyle, appearing in season 1's "Taylor Stiltskin Sweet Sixteen" and season 2's "Precious Lights Pre-School Auction".
 Ken Jeong as Alan Duk, original Party Down CEO who purchases one of Ron's "Soup 'R Crackers", appearing in season 1's "Sin Say Shun Awards After Party" and "Stennheiser-Pong Wedding Reception". Duk was tried and convicted for white collar crimes before season 2.
 Kristen Bell as Uda Bengt, the uptight leader of Valhalla Catering who eventually starts a relationship with Henry after Casey leaves. She appears in season 1's "Stennheiser-Pong Wedding Reception" and season 2's "Party Down Company Picnic".
 Aviva Baumann as Mandy, Ron's girlfriend who appears in season 2's "Jackal Onassis Backstage Party" and "Precious Lights Pre-School Auction".
 Michael Hitchcock as Bolus Lugozshe, the new owner of Party Down, appearing in season 2's "Party Down Company Picnic" and "Constance Carmell Wedding".
 June Diane Raphael as Danielle Lugozshe, daughter of Bolus who begins an affair with Ron and eventually chooses him over her fiancé. She appears in season 2's "Party Down Company Picnic" and "Constance Carmell Wedding".
 James Marsden as Jack Botty (season 3), a successful actor and boyfriend of Evie.

Party Down featured several cameos and guest appearances, including Kevin Hart, Steve Guttenberg, Breckin Meyer, Rick Fox, and George Takei.

Development

Conception
The concept of Party Down was six years in the making, with many of the ideas for the episodes conceptualized years before the show was made. An original unaired pilot was shot at Rob Thomas's house with all the original cast except Lizzy Caplan, whose character was played by Andrea Savage. Paul Rudd was also in the pilot, but could not participate in the series due to film projects. The pilot was used to sell the show to the Starz network.

Crew
The series was executive produced by co-creators John Enbom, Rob Thomas, Dan Etheridge and Paul Rudd. Enbom served as showrunner. The co-executive producers were Jennifer Gwartz and Danielle Stokdyk and Jennifer Dugan was a producer. Beginning with season two, series star Adam Scott served as a producer, while series directors Bryan Gordon and Fred Savage served as supervising producers. Series star Ken Marino directed the second-season finale episode.

Possible film adaptation
On January 8, 2012, Megan Mullally stated a film was being written by John Enbom and she would be part of it. According to Mullally, the film would likely pick up where season two left off.

In a January 2012 interview, Martin Starr commented that "I know that things have gone out that make it seem like it’s official, but there’s nothing official. We all have our fingers crossed and hope that everything works out and that we can get it made. There are small steps being taken that hopefully will lead to people signing contracts and us getting to do something, but at the moment I’m not capable of saying that it’s happening yet". Starr continued that, although he had "heard of the possibility of financiers", he was not sure "to what degree things are moving forward, or if things are moving forward". He then joked "Hopefully those talks lead to us getting to make an amazing movie that all seven of us fans can watch". In December 2015, Adam Scott said the film is unlikely to ever happen, and if anything were to happen it would most likely be new episodes.

Revival
In March 2021, it was reported that a revival as a six-episode limited series was in development at Starz. The originals series creators Enbom, Thomas, Etheridge, and Rudd are involved and Enbom serves as showrunner. In November 2021, Starz officially ordered a six-episode series with Adam Scott, Jane Lynch, Ken Marino, Martin Starr, Ryan Hansen and Megan Mullally to return; Lizzy Caplan did not return due to scheduling conflicts. Jennifer Garner, Tyrel Jackson Williams, and Zoë Chao were cast as series regulars, while James Marsden was cast in a recurring role. The series began production in January 2022 and filming wrapped in March 2022. The third season premiered on February 24, 2023.

Episodes

Season 1 (2009)

Season 2 (2010)

Season 3 (2023)

Reception
The first season of Party Down holds an 87% approval rating with an average score of 8.5 out of 10 on Rotten Tomatoes based on 30 critical reviews. The website's critical consensus is, "Before shows about struggling actors were done to death, there was Party Down." On Metacritic, it has a score of 66 based on 12 reviews, indicating "generally favorable reviews". Andrew Wallenstein of The Hollywood Reporter said, "Lurking behind the surface of this raucous comedy is an astute meditation on the promise and peril of leading an unconventional life, something about which aspiring actors know a thing or two." The American Film Institute named Party Down one of the 10 best shows of 2009.

The second season holds a 100% rating with an average score of 8.9 out of 10 on Rotten Tomatoes based on 13 reviews. The website's critical consensus is, "Party Downs second season further entrenches the show's status as an astute and acidic comedy gem." On Metacritic, it has a score of 84 based on 12 reviews, indicating "universal acclaim". James Poniewozik of Time ranked Party Down as the sixth best television series of 2010. The show was nominated at the 26th TCA Awards for Outstanding Achievement in Comedy.

In 2014, Entertainment Weekly listed the show at #22 in their list of the "26 Best Cult TV Shows Ever" calling it a "smart, drily funny series" and saying, "But the off-beat writing shone brightest in the smaller moments, when the gang was just sitting around a kitchen and bickering to pass the time." In 2020, Briana Kranich of Screen Rant ranked Party Down as the second-most underrated TV show of the 2000s.

The third season holds a 95% rating with an average score of 8 out of 10 on Rotten Tomatoes based on 37 reviews. The website's critical consensus is, "Returning after a long layoff, Party Down brings patient fans a third season that's every bit as sharp – and laugh-out-loud funny – as its predecessors." On Metacritic, it has a score of 81 based on 26 reviews, indicating "universal acclaim".

References

External links

 
 

2009 American television series debuts
2010 American television series endings
2023 American television series debuts
2000s American sitcoms
2010s American sitcoms
2020s American sitcoms
2000s American workplace comedy television series
2010s American workplace comedy television series
2020s American workplace comedy television series
American television series revived after cancellation
English-language television shows
Fictional waiting staff
Starz original programming
Television series about actors
Television series by Lionsgate Television
Television shows set in Los Angeles